Jalilabad District is in Pishva County, Tehran province, Iran. At the 2006 National Census, its population (as a part of the former Pishva District of Varamin County) was 14,151 in 3,246 households. The following census in 2011 counted 13,909 people in 3,621 households, by which time the district had been separated from the county and Pishva County established. At the latest census in 2016, the district had 12,900 inhabitants in 3,636 households.

References 

Pishva County

Districts of Tehran Province

Populated places in Tehran Province

Populated places in Pishva County